Walter of Saint Omer (d 1174), also known as Walter of Fauquembergues or Walter of Tiberias, was the son of William II of Saint Omer and Melisinde of Picquigny, and Prince of Galilee and Tiberias.

Walter married Eschiva of Bures, Princess of Galilee and Tiberias, daughter of Prince Godfrey de Bures. From this marriage they had four sons:
 Hugh II of Saint Omer, Prince of Galilee and Tiberias from 1187 to 1204, who married Margaret of Ibelin, daughter of Balian of Ibelin
 William of Saint Omer, who married Marie, daughter of Renier, constable of Tripoli, widow of Baldwin of Ibelin
 Raoul of Saint Omer, Prince of Galilee from 1204 to 1219, who married Agnès Garnier, daughter of Reginald of Sidon
 Odo of Saint Omer, also known as Oste de Saint-Omer, 1180 to 1217, constable of Tripoli, Lord of Gogulat, who married Fenie Garnier, daughter of Reginald of Sidon

1174 deaths
Princes of Galilee
Saint-Omer family